The 1981–82 Athenian League season was the 59th in the history of Athenian League. The league consisted of 19 teams.

Clubs
The league joined 3 new teams:
 Kingsbury Town, from London Spartan League Premier Division
 Whyteleafe, from London Spartan League Premier Division
 Horley Town, from London Spartan League Premier Division

League table

References

1981–82 in English football leagues
Athenian League